Poso Creek or Posey Creek is an  intermittent stream in Kern County, California.

Poso Creek proper begins at the confluence of Spear Creek and Von Hellem Creek on the west slope of the Greenhorn Mountains. The upper reaches of the creek flow south through the Linn Valley past Posey and Glennville, then to Poso Flat, where it receives Cedar Creek and Little Poso Creek from the east. Below the confluence with Little Poso Creek, it turns west, passing through the Mount Poso and Poso Creek oil fields, which are a likely source of petroleum pollutants during flooding events.

Below the oil fields the creek emerges to the intensively farmed San Joaquin Valley, where it passes between Wasco and McFarland. The creek is crossed by Highway 99 and the Southern Pacific Railroad at Famoso and by the Friant-Kern Canal a few miles downstream. Most of the lower creek flows through artificial channels beginning north of Wasco. Its mouth is on the Kern River floodway in Kern National Wildlife Refuge, which connects the normally dry Buena Vista Lake with Tulare Lake.

As a primarily rain fed stream, Poso Creek flows only seasonally (November to May) in its upper reaches, while the lower part is an ephemeral wash.

Luxilis occidentalis

Poso Creek (or 0-co-ya, creek) is the only place that the fish Luxilis occidentalis is known to have lived except for Four Creeks in the Tulare Valley. It was collected here in 1855 by Dr A.L. Heerman.

References

Rivers of the Sierra Nevada (United States)
Rivers of Kern County, California
Kern River
Tulare Basin watershed
Greenhorn Mountains
Central Valley Project
History of Kern County, California
Pre-statehood history of California
History of Southern California
Rivers of Southern California
Rivers of the Sierra Nevada in California